This was the first edition of the tournament.

Marc-Andrea Hüsler won the title after defeating Juan Pablo Ficovich 6–4, 4–6, 6–3 in the final.

Seeds

Draw

Finals

Top half

Bottom half

References

External links
Main draw
Qualifying draw

San Marcos Open Aguascalientes - 1